The following is a list of notable people who were born, raised, or closely associated with the U.S. state of 'North Carolina.

Academia

Graham Allison (born 1940), political scientist and professor at the John F. Kennedy School of Government at Harvard University (Charlotte)
Dorothy Hansine Andersen (1901–1963), pathologist and pediatrician, first physician to identify cystic fibrosis as a disease (Asheville)
Fred Brooks (born 1931), computer architect, software engineer, and computer scientist (Durham)
Carrie Lougee Broughton (1879–1957), librarian and first woman State Librarian (Raleigh)
John Chavis (1763–1838), African American educator and theologian (Oxford)
Anna J. Cooper (1858–1964), prominent African American scholar, author, sociologist, and educator (Raleigh)
Elson Floyd (1956–2015), 10th president of Washington State University, former president of University of Missouri System and of Western Michigan University (Henderson)
Phillip Griffiths (born 1938), mathematician, known for work in the field of geometry (Raleigh)
Jay U. Gunter (1911–1994), pathologist and amateur astronomer (Sanford)
John Kuykendall (born 1938), served as 15th president of Davidson College (Charlotte)
Daniel McFadden (born 1937), economist, winner of 2000 Nobel Prize in economics (Raleigh)
Kary Mullis (1944–2019), biochemist, inventor of polymerase chain reaction (PCR) technique (Lenoir)
James E. Shepard (1875–1947), pharmacist, civil servant and educator, founder of what became North Carolina Central University (Raleigh)
Thomas Sowell (born 1930), economist, social critic, political commentator, and author (Gastonia)
Martin Wohl (1930–2009), transportation economist and professor (Greensboro)
Anne D. Yoder, biologist, researcher, and professor in the Department of Biology at Duke University (Charlotte)

Artists

Charles Alston (1907–1977), painter, illustrator, muralist, and sculptor (Charlotte)
Murphy Anderson (1926–2015), comics artist (Asheville)
Ernie Barnes (1938–2009), Neo-Mannerist artist and former professional football player (Durham)
James Barnhill (born 1955), sculptor (Asheville)
Romare Bearden (1911–1988), artist (Charlotte)
John T. Biggers (1924–2001), painter and muralist (Gastonia)
Elizabeth Bradford (born 1950), painter (Huntersville)
Selma Burke (1900–1995), sculptor and ceramicist (Mooresville)
Amanda Crowe (1928–2004), woodcarver (Cherokee)
Minnie Evans (1892–1987), folk artist (Pender County)
Herb Jackson (born 1945), painter, given North Carolina Award by governor in 1999 (Raleigh)
John Littleton (born 1957), glass artist with collaborative partner Kate Vogel, based in (Bakersville)
Beverly McIver (born 1962), contemporary artist, mostly known for self-portraits (Greensboro)
Kenneth Noland (1924–2010), painter (Asheville)
Mabel Pugh (1891–1986), painter (Morrisville)
Isaiah Rice (1917–1980), photographer (Asheville)
Bob Timberlake (born 1937), realist artist, known for watercolor paintings and home furnishings (Lexington)
Kate Vogel (born 1956), glass artist with collaborative partner John Littleton, based in (Bakersville)

Business

Louis Bacon (born 1956), hedge fund manager, trader and founder of Moore Capital Management (Raleigh)
Maria Beasley (1836–1913), entrepreneur and inventor
Caleb Bradham (1866–1934), inventor of Pepsi-Cola (New Bern)
James Edgar Broyhill (1892–1988), industrialist, founder of Broyhill Furniture Industries, Inc. (Wilkes County)
Charles Albert Cannon (1892–1971), textile executive, president of Cannon Mills (Concord)
Benjamin Newton Duke (1855–1929), tobacco and electric power industrialist, co-founder of Duke Energy (Durham)
James Buchanan Duke (1856–1925), tobacco and electric power industrialist, founder of American Tobacco Company, co-founder of Duke Energy (Durham)
Richard Jordan Gatling (1818–1903), inventor of the Gatling gun (Hertford County)
James Goodnight (born 1943), software developer, CEO of SAS Institute (Wilmington)
William B. Harrison Jr. (born 1943), former CEO of JPMorgan Chase (Rocky Mount)
E. Lee Hennessee (1952–2016), pioneer hedge fund manager (Raleigh)
Chris Hughes (born 1983), co-founder of Facebook (Hickory)
Richard Jenrette (1929–2018), co-founder of investment bank Donaldson, Lufkin & Jenrette (Raleigh)
Ralph Ketner (1920–2016), founder of Food Lion (Salisbury)
Kelly King (born 1948), Chairman and CEO of BB&T (Raleigh)
Herman Lay (1909–1982), businessman, founder of Lay's potato chips (Charlotte)
Debra L. Lee (born 1954), CEO of BET (Greensboro)
Leon Levine (born 1937), businessman and philanthropist, founder of Family Dollar (Wadesboro)
Ann Livermore (born 1958), former Executive Vice President at Hewlett-Packard (Greensboro)
Vince McMahon (born 1945), Chairman of World Wrestling Entertainment (WWE) (Pinehurst)
Dalton L. McMichael (1914–2001), textile executive (Wentworth)
John Merrick (1859–1919), businessman, founder of North Carolina Mutual Life Insurance Company (Clinton)
Ricky Moore, chef and restaurant owner
James Owens (born 1946), former Chairman and CEO of Caterpillar Inc. (Elizabeth City)
Ronald Perelman (born 1943), businessman, investor, CEO of MacAndrews & Forbes (Greensboro)
John Henry Phelan (1877–1957), oil producer and philanthropist (Charlotte)
R. J. Reynolds (1850–1918), founder of R. J. Reynolds Tobacco Company (Winston-Salem)
Julian Robertson (born 1932), hedge fund manager (Salisbury)
Charles Clinton Spaulding (1874–1952), served as president of NC Mutual Life Insurance Company (Columbus County)
Stanley Tanger (1923–2010), founder of Tanger Factory Outlet Centers (Greensboro)
David S. Taylor (born 1958), Chairman and CEO of Procter & Gamble (Charlotte)

Entertainers
A–L

Sidney Blackmer (1895–1973), actor (Salisbury)
Randy Boone (born 1942), actor and singer (Fayetteville)
Alicia Bridges (born 1953), singer-songwriter ("I Love the Nightlife") (Charlotte)
Doug Brochu (born 1990), actor (Fayetteville)
Ben Browder (born 1962), actor (Charlotte)
Cliff Cash (born 1981), stand-up comedian (Gastonia)
Jim David, stand-up comedian, actor (Asheville)
Cecil B. DeMille (1881–1959), film director and producer (Washington)
Tom DiCillo (born 1953), film director (Camp Le Jeune)
Jimmy Donaldson (born 1998), better known online as MrBeast; YouTuber, entrepreneur, and philanthropist (Greenville)
Jennifer Ehle (born 1969), actress (Winston-Salem)
Mike Evans (1949–2006), actor (Salisbury)
Ian Flynn (born 1982), comic book writer (Charlotte)
Penny Fuller (born 1940), actress (Durham)
Mark Freiburger (born 1983), filmmaker (Charlotte)
Zach Galifianakis (born 1969), comedian, actor, writer (Wilkesboro)
Gallagher (born 1947), comedian (Fort Bragg)
Ava Gardner (1922–1990), actress (Smithfield)
Kathryn Grayson (1922–2010), actress and singer (Winston-Salem)
Paul Green (1894–1981), Pulitzer Prize-winning playwright, author of The Lost Colony (Lillington)
Hayes Grier (born 2000), internet personality (Davidson)
Nash Grier (born 1997), internet personality (Davidson)
Pam Grier (born 1949), actress (Winston-Salem)
Rhoda Griffis (born 1945), actress (Raleigh)
Andy Griffith (1926–2012), actor, singer, director (Mount Airy)
George Grizzard (1928–2007), Emmy- and Tony-winning actor (Roanoke Rapids)
Julianna Guill (born 1987), actress (Winston-Salem)
Jester Hairston (1901–2000), actor (Belews Creek)
Michael C. Hall (born 1971), actor (Raleigh)
Murray Hamilton (1923–1986), actor (Washington)
Shirley Hemphill (1947–1999), stand-up comedian, actress (Asheville)
Jackee Harry (born 1956), actress (Winston-Salem)
Molly Haskell (born 1939), film critic (Charlotte)
Ed Hinton (1927–1958), actor (Wilmington)
Edwin Hodge (born 1985), actor (Jacksonville)
Gill Holland (born 1964), film producer (Davidson)
Skip Hollandsworth (born 1957), screenwriter (Kannapolis)
Laurel Holloman (born 1971), actress (Chapel Hill)
Brian Huskey (born 1968), actor, comedian (Charlotte)
Earle Hyman (1926–2017), actor (Rocky Mount)
Anne Jeffreys (1923–2017), actress (Goldsboro)
Burgess Jenkins (born 1973), actor (Winston-Salem)
Ken Jeong (born 1969), comedian, actor (Greensboro)
Star Jones (born 1962), television personality (Badin)
Darwin Joston (1937–1998), actor (Winston-Salem)
Allyn King (1899–1930), actress
Tim Kirkman (born 1966), film director (Monroe)
Sharon Lawrence (born 1961), actress (Charlotte / Raleigh)
Beth Leavel (born 1955), actress (Raleigh)
Chyler Leigh (born 1982), actress (Charlotte)
Barbara Loden (1932–1980), actor and film director (Marion)

M–Z

James McEachin (born 1930), actor (Rennert)
Jane McNeill, actress (Whiteville)
Robert Duncan McNeill (born 1964), actor, director (Raleigh)
Eddie Mills (born 1972), actor (Kannapolis)
Rogelio Mills, television personality, author, and recording artist (Charlotte)
Julianne Moore (born 1960), actress (Fort Bragg)
Anita Morris (1943–1994), actress (Durham)
Anna Mercedes Morris (born 1977), stuntwoman (Charlotte)
Laura Moss (born 1973), actress (Kings Mountain)
Frankie Muniz (born 1985), actor, best known as the star of the popular television series Malcolm in the Middle, spent childhood in North Carolina (Knightdale)
Mike Muscat (born 1952), actor (Fort Bragg)
Link Neal (born 1978), internetainer (Buies Creek)
John Haymes Newton (born 1965), actor (Chapel Hill)
Lee Norris (born 1981), actor (Greenville)
J.T. Petty (born 1977), video game maker (Raleigh)
Jaime Pressly (born 1977), actress, model (Kinston)
Emily Proctor (born 1968), actress (Raleigh)
Jim Rash (born 1970), actor, comedian (Charlotte)
Peyton Reed (born 1964), film and television director (Raleigh)
Jon Reep (born 1972), stand-up comedian (Hickory)
Nina Repeta (born 1967), actress (Shelby)
Tequan Richmond (born 1992), actor (Burlington)
Britt Robertson (born 1990), actress (Charlotte)
Marcy Rylan (born 1980), actress (Providence Township)
Soupy Sales (1926–2009), comedian (Franklinton)
Christoph Sanders (born 1988), actor (Arden / Hendersonville)
Hunter Schafer (born 1999), actress (Raleigh)
Paul Schneider (born 1976), actor (Asheville)
Judith Scott, actress (Fort Bragg)
Nick Searcy (born 1959), actor (Cullowhee)
Amy Sedaris (born 1961), actress and comedian, spent childhood in NC, best known as the star of the television series Strangers with Candy (Raleigh)
David Sedaris (born 1956), author and essayist (brother to Amy), spent childhood in NC (Raleigh)
Matthew Settle (born 1969), actor (Hickory)
J. B. Smoove (born 1964), actor (Plymouth)
Arthur Smith (1921–2014), musician, composer, radio and television producer (Charlotte)
Josef Sommer (born 1934), character actor, appeared in movies such as X-Men: The Last Stand, The Sum of All Fears, and Patch Adams (raised in North Carolina)
Margo Stilley (born 1982), actress (Bear Creek)
Jessica Stroup (born 1986), actress (Charlotte)
Berlinda Tolbert, film and television actress (Charlotte)
Skeet Ulrich (born 1970), actor (Concord)
Liz Vassey (born 1972), actress (Raleigh)
Reginald VelJohnson (born 1952), actor (Raleigh)
Briana Venskus (born 1987), actress (Wilmington)
Ben Vereen (born 1946), actor, entertainer (Laurinburg)
Jill Wagner (born 1979), actress, model (Winston-Salem)
Gregory Walcott (1928–2015), actor (Wendell)
James Harvey Ward (born 1978), actor (Greenville)
Lachlan Watson (born 2001), actor (Raleigh)
Kevin Williamson (born 1965), screenwriter (New Bern)
Mary Elizabeth Winstead (born 1984), actress (Rocky Mount)
Evan Rachel Wood (born 1987), actress (Raleigh)
Bellamy Young (born 1970), actress (Asheville)

Government, military, and public figures

A–I

Alma Adams (born 1946), U.S. Congresswoman 2014–present (High Point)
John Ashe (1725–1781), Brigadier General during the American Revolutionary War, in charge of North Carolina militia and state troops from 1776 to 1779 (New Hanover County)
William Blount (1749–1800), first North Carolina signatory of United States Constitution; played a role in the creation of the State of Tennessee (Windsor)
Erskine Bowles (born 1945), White House Chief of Staff under Bill Clinton, president of University of North Carolina system (Greensboro)
William G. Boykin, Deputy Undersecretary of Defense for Intelligence under George W. Bush, retired lieutenant general for U.S. Army (New Bern)
Braxton Bragg (1817–1876), General in Confederate States Army; led Confederate Army of Tennessee in battles of Perryville, Stones River, Chickamauga, and Third Battle of Chattanooga against Union General Ulysses Grant (Warrenton)
Jim Broyhill (born 1927), former Republican U.S. Representative and Senator from North Carolina; son of furniture magnate J. E. Broyhill (Lenoir)
James Burnley (born 1948), U.S. Secretary of Transportation under President Ronald Reagan (Greensboro)
Robert Byrd (1917–2010), U.S. Senator from West Virginia; longest-serving Senator in American history (North Wilkesboro)
Lee Carter, elected delegate for 50th House district of Virginia and retired U.S. Marine veteran as IT specialist (Elizabeth City)
Julius L. Chambers (1936–2013), civil rights attorney who successfully argued 1971 Swann v. Charlotte-Mecklenburg Board of Education school busing case before U.S. Supreme Court (Mount Gilead)
Levi Coffin (1798–1877), abolitionist and educator known as "President" of the Underground Railroad; credited with helping over 2,000 slaves escape to freedom before Civil War (Greensboro)
Roy Cooper (born 1957), 75th governor of North Carolina (Nashville)
Jerry K. Crump (1933–1977), U.S. Army soldier; Medal of Honor recipient (Charlotte) 
Josephus Daniels (1862–1948), U.S. Secretary of the Navy 1913–1921 under President Woodrow Wilson; journalist and founder of Raleigh News and Observer newspaper (Washington)
William Dodd (1869–1940), U.S. ambassador to Nazi-Germany 1933–1938 under Franklin Roosevelt (Clayton)
Elizabeth Dole (born 1936), U.S. Senator and Secretary of Transportation under President Ronald Reagan; wife to former Republican Senate Majority Leader Bob Dole (Salisbury)
Sam Ervin (1896–1985), four-term U.S. Senator and Chairman of Senate Watergate Investigation Committee; began legislative process which led to resignation of President Richard Nixon (Morganton)
Virginia Foxx (born 1943), U.S. Congresswoman 2005–present; graduated from the University of North Carolina at Chapel Hill (Crossnore)
Charles A. Gabriel (1928–2003), U.S. Air Force General, 11th chief of staff of U.S. Air Force (Lincolnton)
Nick Galifianakis (born 1928), U.S. Congressman from North Carolina 1967–1973 (Durham)
Richard Jordan Gatling (1818–1903), physician and inventor of Gatling gun (Hertford County)
John Gibbon (1827–1896), Union Army general in American Civil War and colonel in the American Indian Wars (Charlotte)
The Greensboro Four, male African-American students at North Carolina A&T State University who in 1960 started first civil rights sit-in; led to restaurants being desegregated throughout Southern U.S.
John H. Hager (1936–2020), Lieutenant Governor of Virginia
William D. Halyburton Jr. (1924–1945), United States Navy hospital corpsman; posthumously awarded Medal of Honor (Wilmington)
Jesse Helms (1921–2008), retired five-term Senator from North Carolina and national spokesman for right-wing causes (Monroe)
James Pinckney Henderson (1808–1858), lawyer, politician, soldier, and first Governor of Texas (Lincolnton)
Robert Hoke (1837–1912), Major General in Confederate States Army, director of North Carolina Railroad (Lincolnton)
William Woods Holden (1818–1892), prominent Southern Unionist, served as 38th and 40th Governor of North Carolina (Hillsborough)
Jim Hunt (born 1937), Governor of North Carolina for a record four terms; opposed Jesse Helms in 1984 Senate race (Wilson)

J–Z

Andrew Jackson (1767–1845), 7th President of the United States, 1829–1837 (Waxhaw) (It should be noted his birth records are unclear and he may be from South Carolina side of border.)
Lawrence Joel (1928–1984), United States Army soldier; Medal of Honor recipient (Winston-Salem)
Andrew Johnson (1808–1875), 17th President of the United States, 1865–1869 (Raleigh)
Henry Johnson (1892–1929), United States Army soldier in World War I; posthumously awarded Medal of Honor (Winston-Salem)
Joseph Lane (1801–1881), United States Army general and member of U.S. Senate from Oregon (Buncombe County)
William Lenoir (1751–1839), American patriot, served in the Battle of Kings Mountain and several other skirmishes during the American Revolution, also the first President of the board of trustees of the University of North Carolina at Chapel Hill (Wilkes County)
Dolley Madison (1768–1849), wife of President James Madison (Guilford County)
Linda McMahon (born 1948), Administrator of the Small Business Administration under President Donald Trump (New Bern)
Solomon Meredith (1810–1875), Union Army general, one of the commanders of the Iron Brigade of the Army of the Potomac (Guilford County)
Mick Mulvaney (born 1967), South Carolina Congressman, Director of Office of Management and Budget under President Donald Trump (Charlotte)
Hardy Murfree (1752–1809), Lieutenant Colonel from North Carolina during the American Revolutionary War (Murfreesboro)
Charles P. Murray Jr. (1921–2011), United States Army officer; Medal of Honor recipient during World War II (Wilmington)
Walter Hines Page (1855–1918), U.S. ambassador to Britain during First World War (Cary)
William Dorsey Pender (1834–1863), Major General, one of youngest generals in Confederate States Army, mortally wounded at Battle of Gettysburg (Edgecombe County)
James K. Polk (1797–1849), 11th President of the United States, 1845–1849 (Mecklenburg County)
Eliza Jane Pratt (1902–1981), U.S. Congresswoman 1946–1947 (Anson County)
Stephen Dodson Ramseur (1837–1864), Major General in Confederate States Army; mortally wounded at the Battle of Cedar Creek Virginia (Lincolnton)
William Cary Renfrow (1845–1922), 3rd Governor of Oklahoma Territory, 1893–1897 (Smithfield)
Hiram Revels (1822–1901), first African-American member of United States Senate (Fayetteville)
Jennifer Roberts (born 1960), served as the 58th Mayor of Charlotte (Charlotte)
Hugh Shelton (born 1942), retired U.S. Army General, Chairman of Joint Chiefs of Staff 1997–2001 (Tarboro)
Edward Snowden (born 1983), NSA contractor who leaked top-secret documents regarding worldwide spying program (Elizabeth City)
Richard Dobbs Spaight Sr (1758–1802), second NC signatory of U.S. Constitution and eighth Governor of North Carolina (New Bern)
Edgar V. Starnes (born 1956), served in the North Carolina General Assembly (Granite Falls)
Blake Wayne Van Leer (1926–1997), Commander and Captain in the U.S. Navy, led SeaBee program and lead the nuclear research and power unit at McMurdo Station during Operation Deep Freeze (Raleigh)
Don Vaughan (born 1952), former member of the North Carolina State Senate who pushed for Susie's Law in 2010 (Greensboro)
Robert F. Williams (1925–1996), civil rights activist who advocated using black armed guards to defend African-American neighborhoods from white supremacist groups (Monroe)
John Ancrum Winslow (1811–1873), officer in the United States Navy during the Mexican–American War and American Civil War (Wilmington)

Journalism and media

Mary Ann Akers, political gossip columnist (High Point)
David Brinkley (1920–2003), television newscaster, host of ABC-TV's This Week with David Brinkley 1981–96; co-anchor of the Huntley-Brinkley Report nightly newscast on NBC-TV 1956–70 (Wilmington)
Sharon Dahlonega Raiford Bush, née Sharon Crews (born 1952), American television's first African-American female weather anchor of prime-time news (Greensboro)
Howard Cosell (1918–1995), television sports journalist, star of ABC's Monday Night Football, commentator for many fights of Muhammad Ali (Winston-Salem)
Josephus Daniels (1862–1948), founder of Raleigh News and Observer newspaper; U.S. Secretary of the Navy 1913–1921 under President Woodrow Wilson (Washington)
David Gergen (born 1942), journalist; editor-at-large for U.S. News & World Report; director of Center for Public Leadership at John F. Kennedy School of Government at Harvard; senior political analyst at CNN (Durham)
Al Hunt (born 1942), journalist, managing editor for Bloomberg News, panelist on CNN's Capital Gang news program (Winston-Salem)
Carl Kassel (1934–2018), radio personality for NPR and journalist (Goldsboro)
Anna Kooiman (born 1984), anchor and reporter for Fox News; co-host of Fox & Friends (Charlotte)
Charles Kuralt (1934–1997), journalist and CBS television personality (Wilmington)
Jennifer Loven, journalist and White House correspondent for Associated Press (Matthews)
Edward R. Murrow (1908–1965), CBS News journalist and pioneer of television (near Greensboro)
Walter Hines Page (1855–1918), journalist and publisher (Cary)
Charlie Rose (born 1942), interviewer and journalist; host of PBS television talk show and CBS This Morning (Henderson)
Morgan Radford (born 1987), news reporter for NBC News and MSNBC (Greensboro)
Vermont C. Royster (1914–1996), editor-in-chief of The Wall Street Journal 1957–1970; winner of two Pulitzer Prizes (Raleigh)
Stuart Scott (1965–2015), television sportscaster, anchor of ESPN's SportsCenter; graduated from University of North Carolina (Winston-Salem)
André Leon Talley (born 1949), professional fashion journalist and former editor-at-large of Vogue (Durham)
Wilbert Tatum (1933–2009), editor, publisher, chairman and chief executive officer of New York AmsterdamMusicians
A–G

Ryan Adams (born 1974), singer-songwriter (Jacksonville and Raleigh)
Clay Aiken (born 1978), pop singer (Raleigh)
Doug Aldrich (born 1964), guitarist (Raleigh)
Tim Alexander (born 1965), drummer for Primus (Cherry Point)
Gerald Alston (born 1951), of R&B group Gerald Alston & The Manhattans (Henderson)
Tori Amos (born 1963), singer (Newton)
Sunshine Anderson (born 1974), R&B and soul singer-songwriter (Winston-Salem and Charlotte)
Seth Avett (born 1980), singer-songwriter, artist (Concord)
Scott Avett (born 1976), singer-songwriter, artist (Concord)
Nicholas William Bailey (born 1980), film and television composer, singer-songwriter (New Bern)
Bessie Banks (born 1938), singer (born Bessie White)
Warren Barfield (born 1979), Christian musician (Goldsboro)
Fantasia Barrino (born 1984), singer, American Idol Season 3 winner (High Point)
Riley Baugus (born 1965), indigenous Appalachian musician (Walkertown)
B.o.B (born 1988), rapper and record producer (Winston-Salem)
Margie Bowes (1941–2020), country music singer (Roxboro)
Alicia Bridges (born 1953), disco singer (Lawndale)
Chuck Brown (1936–2012), known as "The Godfather of Go-go" (Garysburg)
Nappy Brown (1922-2008), R&B singer (Charlotte)
Shirley Caesar (born 1938), singer (Durham)
Jason Michael Carroll (born 1978), singer (Raleigh)
Spencer Chamberlain (born 1983), singer-songwriter (Chapel Hill)
Eric Church (born 1977), country singer-songwriter (Granite Falls)
George Clinton (born 1941), funk musician (Kannapolis)
John Coltrane (1926–1967), jazz musician (Hamlet)
David L. Cook (born 1968), Christian recording artist and comedian (Charlotte)
J. Cole (born 1985), rapper (Fayetteville)
Luke Combs (born 1990), country music singer (Asheville)
Elizabeth Cotten (1895–1987), folk and blues singer-songwriter (Carrboro)
Bucky Covington (born 1977), singer (Rockingham)
DaBaby (born 1991), rapper (Charlotte)
Charlie Daniels (1936–2020), singer-songwriter (Wilmington)
Chris Daughtry (born 1979), singer (Roanoke Rapids and Greensboro)
Tommy DeCarlo (born 1965), singer for Boston (Charlotte)
Patrick Douthit (a.k.a. 9th Wonder) (born 1975), hip-hop producer (Winston-Salem)
Jermaine Dupri (born 1972), rap artist and record producer (Asheville)
Fred Durst (born 1970), frontman for the rap rock band Limp Bizkit; grew up and graduated from high school in NC (Gastonia)
Mitch Easter (born 1954), singer-songwriter, producer (R.E.M.), frontman for Let's Active (Winston-Salem)
Donna Fargo (born 1945), singer-songwriter (Mount Airy)
Roberta Flack (born 1937), Grammy Award-winning singer (Asheville)
Ben Folds (born 1966), singer-songwriter (Winston-Salem and Chapel Hill)
Audley Freed guitarist, songwriter
Nnenna Freelon (born 1964), six-time Grammy-nominated jazz singer (Durham)
Blind Boy Fuller (1908–1941), blues guitarist and singer (Wadesboro)
Alfreda Gerald, opera singer and classical soloist (Morganton)
Don Gibson (1928–2003), country music singer-songwriter, Country Music Hall of Fame (Shelby)
Rhiannon Giddens (born 1977), singer-songwriter, multi-instrumentalist, co-founder of the Carolina Chocolate Drops (Greensboro)
Cordae (born 1997), rapper (Raleigh)

H–Z

Anthony Hamilton (born 1985), soul artist (Charlotte)
George Hamilton IV (1937–2014), country singer (Winston-Salem)
Wilbert Harrison (1929–1994), singer, pianist (Charlotte)
Warren Haynes (born 1960), Southern rock and blues singer, guitarist for Gov't Mule and The Allman Brothers Band (Asheville)
Jimmy Herring (born 1962), guitarist for Widespread Panic (Fayetteville)
Byron Hill (born 1952), country songwriter (Winston-Salem)
Michael Houser (1962–2002), guitarist, founding member of Widespread Panic (Boone)
Maria Howell (born 1962), singer (Gastonia)
Stonewall Jackson (born 1932), country singer and musician (Tabor City)
Caleb Johnson (born 1991), singer and American Idol Season 13 winner (Asheville)
Randy Jones (born 1953), singer of Village People (Raleigh)
"K-Ci" and "JoJo" Hailey (born 1969 and 1971 respectively), R&B duo of R&B group Jodeci (Charlotte)
Hal Kemp (1904–1940), bandleader, composer, arranger with two number one songs (Chapel Hill)
Cheyenne Kimball (born 1990), singer-songwriter, guitarist, mandolinist (Wilmington)
Ben E. King (1938–2015), singer-songwriter (Henderson)
Jim Lauderdale (born 1957), bluegrass and country singer-songwriter (Troutman)
Dennis Lee (born 1988), singer-songwriter (Winston-Salem and Raleigh)
Del McCoury (born 1939), bluegrass musician (Bakersville)
Scotty McCreery (born 1993), country singer and American Idol Season 10 winner (Garner)
Tift Merritt (born 1975), singer-songwriter, musician (Raleigh)
Ronnie Milsap (born 1946), country singer-songwriter (Robbinsville)
Dave Moody (born 1962), Dove Award-winning producer, songwriter, filmmaker (Fayetteville)
Thelonious Monk (1917–1982), jazz composer, pianist (Rocky Mount)
The-Dream, real name Terius Nash, R&B singer, writer, producer (Rockingham)
Oliver (born William Oliver Swofford) (1945–2000), singer (North Wilkesboro)
Petey Pablo (born 1978), rap artist (Greenville)
Maceo Parker (born 1943), songwriter, musician (Kinston)
Kellie Pickler (born 1986), singer, American Idol contestant (Albemarle)
Joseph Poole (born 1976), rock musician (Charlotte)
Neil Pope (born 1978), gospel singer (Asheboro)
Edward Wiley Ray (born 1926), music executive, songwriter (Franklin)
Del Reeves (1934–2007), country singer-songwriter (Sparta)
Calvin Richardson (born 1976), R&B singer-songwriter (Monroe, Union County)
Max Roach (1924–2007), jazz drummer (Pasquotank County)
Porter Robinson (born 1992), electronic dance musician (Chapel Hill)
Earl Scruggs (1924–2012), bluegrass banjo player (Shelby)
William Self (1906–1998), organist and choirmaster (Lenoir)
Woody Shaw (1944–1989), trumpeter, DownBeat Jazz Hall of Fame (Laurinburg)
Nina Simone (1933–2003), singer, Grammy Award Hall of Fame (Tryon)
Arthur Smith (1921–2014), composer, entertainer, producer (Charlotte)
Chloe Smith, singer-songwriter, multi-instrumentalist for Rising Appalachia (Buncombe County)
Leah Song, singer-songwriter, multi-instrumentalist, frontwoman for Rising Appalachia (Buncombe County)
Peter Stroud, guitarist, rock musician; co-founder of 65amps (Greensboro)
Supastition (born 1976), hip-hop artist (Greenville)
James Taylor (born 1948), singer-songwriter in Rock and Roll Hall of Fame (Chapel Hill)
Randy Travis (born 1959), singer in Country Music Hall of Fame (Marshville)
Loudon Wainwright III (born 1946), songwriter, folk singer, humorist (Chapel Hill)
Doc Watson (1923–2012), folk guitarist (Deep Gap)
Link Wray (1929–2005), guitarist, rock musician, songwriter (Dunn)
George Younce (1930–2005), gospel singer (Caldwell County)

Sportspeople
A–B

Dustin Ackley (born 1988), second baseman and outfielder for New York Yankees (Winston-Salem)
Sam Aiken (born 1980), wide receiver; Buffalo Bills (2003–07); New England Patriots (2008–10) (Warsaw)
Walt Aikens (born 1991), cornerback and free safety for Miami Dolphins (Charlotte)
Dwayne Allen (born 1990), tight end for Indianapolis Colts (Fayetteville)
Kadeem Allen (born 1993), basketball player in the NBA and currently for Hapoel Haifa in the Israeli Basketball Premier League
Keenan Allen (born 1992), wide receiver for San Diego Chargers (Greensboro)
James Anderson (born 1983), linebacker for Carolina Panthers (Roanoke Rapids)
Stephone Anthony (born 1992), linebacker for New Orleans Saints (Polkton)
Luke Appling (1907–1991), Baseball Hall of Fame shortstop for the Chicago White Sox (High Point)
Chris Archer (born 1988), pitcher for Tampa Bay Rays (Clayton)
Darrell Armstrong (born 1968), NBA point guard, assistant coach for Dallas Mavericks (Gastonia)
Shawn Armstrong (born 1990), relief pitcher for Cleveland Indians (Bridgeton)
J. J. Arrington (born 1983), pro football player (Rocky Mount)
Kathleen Baker (born 1997), Olympic gold and silver medalist swimmer (Winston-Salem)
Scott Bankhead (born 1963), former MLB pitcher (Raleigh)
Billy Ray Barnes (born 1935), NFL player 1957–66 for Philadelphia Eagles, Washington Redskins, and Minnesota Vikings; 3-time Pro Bowl (Landis)
Brian Barnes (born 1967), MLB pitcher for Montreal Expos, Cleveland Indians, Los Angeles Dodgers (Roanoke Rapids)
Darrius Barnes (born 1986), Major League Soccer player (Raleigh)
Jim Beatty (born 1934), track and field athlete, first person to break 4-minute barrier on an indoor track (Charlotte)
Bobby Bell (born 1940), Pro Football Hall of Fame linebacker and defensive end for Kansas City Chiefs (Shelby)
Walt Bellamy (1938–2013), basketball player, NBA Hall of Fame (New Bern)
Ricky Berens (born 1988), two-time Olympic gold medalist in swimming (Charlotte)
Heather Bergsma (born 1989), Olympic speed skater, earned a bronze medal (High Point)
Brenton Bersin (born 1990), wide receiver for Carolina Panthers (Charlotte)
Henry Bibby (born 1949), basketball player for 3-time national champion UCLA, NBA player, college and pro coach (Franklinton)
Eddie Biedenbach (born 1945), basketball player for NBA's Los Angeles Lakers, Phoenix Suns, and for North Carolina State University, NC Sports Hall of Fame (Wrightsville Beach)
Ryan Blaney (born 1993), NASCAR driver (High Point)
Arthur Bluethenthal (1891–1918), college football player and World War I pilot
Stephen Bowen (born 1984), defensive end for New York Jets (Holly Ridge)
Garrett Bradbury (born 1995), center for the Minnesota Vikings (Charlotte)
Hal Bradley (1913–1981), football player for NFL's Washington Redskins and Chicago Cardinals (Winston-Salem)
Louis Breeden, defensive back with Cincinnati Bengals (1978–1987)
Andre Brown (born 1986), fullback for Washington Redskins (Greenville)
Dyami Brown (born 1999), football player
Jason Brown (born 1983), center for St. Louis Rams (Henderson)
Derek Brunson (born 1984), UFC fighter (Wilmington)
Madison Bumgarner (born 1989), MLB pitcher, 3-time World Series champion, 2014 World Series MVP (Hudson)
Smoky Burgess (1927–1991), Major League Baseball player, 9-time All-Star (Caroleen)
Josh Bush (born 1989), free safety for Denver Broncos (Burlington)
Crezdon Butler (born 1987), cornerback for Pittsburgh Steelers (Asheville)
Dremiel Byers (born 1974), Greco-Roman wrestler, World Champion and member of two Olympic teams (Kings Mountain)
William Byron (born 1997), NASCAR driver (Charlotte)

C–G

Brian Canter (born 1987), professional bull rider on Professional Bull Riders Built Ford Tough Series tour (Randleman)
Chris Canty (born 1982), defensive lineman for the New York Giants (Charlotte)
Bruce Carter (born 1988), linebacker for Tampa Bay Buccaneers (Havelock)
Carter Capps, relief pitcher for Miami Marlins, born in Kinston
Joey Cheek (born 1979), Olympic gold medalist speed skater (Greensboro)
Lonnie Chisenhall (born 1988), utility player for Cleveland Indians (Newport)
Dwight Clark (1957–2018), two-time All-Pro wide receiver for San Francisco 49ers; led 49ers to first Super Bowl appearance with a last-minute touchdown catch in 1982 NFC Championship Game (Kinston)
Jim Cleamons (born 1949), former NBA guard, Los Angeles Lakers, Cleveland Cavaliers, and New York Knicks; assistant coach for Lakers (Lincolnton)
Tony Cloninger (1940–2018), MLB pitcher (Cherryville)
Jonathan Cooper (born 1990), guard for NFL's Arizona Cardinals (Wilmington)
Terrance Copper (born 1982), wide receiver for Kansas City Chiefs (Washington)
Charlie Cozart (1919–2004), MLB pitcher for the Boston Braves (Lenoir)
Wade Crane (1944–2010), professional pool player (Robbinsville)
Sam Cronin (born 1986), former Major League Soccer player (Winston-Salem)
Alge Crumpler (born 1977), tight end for New England Patriots, selected four times for Pro Bowl (Greenville)
Chris Culliver (born 1988), cornerback for San Francisco 49ers (Garner)
Kenwin Cummings (born 1986), former NFL linebacker for New York Jets and Dallas Cowboys (Maxton)
Aaron Curry (born 1986), linebacker for Seattle Seahawks (Fayetteville)
Seth Curry (born 1990), player for Dallas Mavericks (Charlotte)
Stephen Curry (born 1988), player for 3-time NBA champion Golden State Warriors, 2-time NBA MVP (Charlotte)
Antico Dalton (born 1975), former NFL player (Eden)
Brad Daugherty (born 1965), All-America basketball player for UNC-Chapel Hill and NBA player for the Cleveland Cavaliers; television commentator for Raycom Media (Black Mountain)
Russell Davis (born 1975), former NFL defensive tackle (Fayetteville)
Walter Davis (born 1954), basketball player for UNC-Chapel Hill and NBA's Phoenix Suns; 6-time NBA All-Star (Pineville)
Lindsay Deal (1911–1979), MLB outfielder for the Brooklyn Dodgers (Lenoir)
James L. Dickey III (born 1996), basketball player for Hapoel Haifa of the Israeli Basketball Premier League
Austin Dillon (born 1990), NASCAR driver (Lewisville)
Mike Dillon (born 1965), former NASCAR driver (Lexington)
Ty Dillon (born 1992), NASCAR driver (Lewisville)
Matt Dodge (born 1987), former punter for New York Giants (Morehead City)
Ryan Dull (born 1989), relief pitcher for Oakland Athletics (Winston-Salem)
Ray Durham (born 1971), MLB second baseman (Charlotte)
Kony Ealy (born 1991), defensive end for Carolina Panthers (Morganton)
Dale Earnhardt Sr. (1951–2001), renowned NASCAR driver nicknamed "The Intimidator" for aggressive driving style; winner of 76 NASCAR races, 7-time Cup Series champion (Kannapolis)
Dale Earnhardt Jr. (born 1974), championship-winning NASCAR driver and protégé of his father, Dale Earnhardt Sr. (Kannapolis)
Brad Edwards (born 1966), safety for Washington Redskins, made two interceptions in Super Bowl XXVI (Lumberton)
Carl Eller (born 1942), former NFL defensive end; member of Pro Football Hall of Fame (Winston-Salem)
Dannell Ellerbe (born 1985), linebacker for New Orleans Saints (Hamlet)
Vince Evans (born 1955), 1977 Rose Bowl MVP for University of Southern California, quarterback for NFL's Los Angeles Raiders and Chicago Bears (Greensboro)
Rick Ferrell (1905–1995), Baseball Hall of Fame catcher for Boston Red Sox Washington Senators and St Louis Browns (Durham)
Perry Fewell (born 1962), coach for Washington Redskins (Gastonia)
Cortland Finnegan (born 1984), cornerback for Carolina Panthers (Fayetteville)
Raymond Floyd (born 1942), professional golfer, member of the World Golf Hall of Fame (Fayetteville)
Phil Ford (born 1956), retired point guard for Kansas City Kings, New Jersey Nets, Milwaukee Bucks and Houston Rockets, won '78–'79 NBA Rookie of the Year Award; NBA coach (Rocky Mount)
Roman Gabriel (born 1940), All-America quarterback for NC State; played for NFL's Los Angeles Rams and Philadelphia Eagles, named league's MVP in 1969 (Wilmington)
Omar Gaither (born 1984), linebacker for Philadelphia Eagles (Charlotte)
Julian Gamble (born 1989), basketball player in the Israeli Basketball Premier League
Harry Gant (born 1940), former NASCAR driver (Taylorsville)
David Garrard (born 1978), East Carolina University football player, quarterback for Jacksonville Jaguars (Durham)
Kenny Gattison (born 1964), NBA player, coach for Atlanta Hawks (Wilmington)
Alvin Gentry (born 1954), head coach for Phoenix Suns (Shelby)
Joe Gibbs (born 1940), Hall of Fame head coach for NFL's Washington Redskins and owner of Joe Gibbs Racing; won Super Bowl in 1982, 1987, and 1991; won the NASCAR Cup Series Championship in 2000, 2002, 2005 and 2015 (Mocksville)
Marcus Gilchrist (born 1988), cornerback for San Diego Chargers (High Point)
Harry Giles (born 1998), NBA player for the Sacramento Kings (Winston-Salem)
Mark Grace (born 1964), baseball player, Chicago Cubs and Arizona Diamondbacks All-Star and Gold Glove Award-winning first baseman; MLB record for hits (1,754) and doubles (364) in decade of 1990s, broadcaster, coach (Winston-Salem)
Jimmy Graham (born 1986), tight end for New Orleans Saints, Seattle Seahawks, and Green Bay Packers (Goldsboro)
Robert Griswold (born 1996), swimmer
Todd Gurley (born 1994), NFL running back, 3-time Pro Bowl selection and 2-time First-team All-Pro (Tarboro)

H–K

Bill Haas (born 1982), professional golfer (Charlotte)
Chris Hairston (born 1989), offensive tackle for Buffalo Bills (Winston-Salem)
P. J. Hairston (born 1992), player for Charlotte Hornets (Greensboro)
Jimmie Hall (born 1938), MLB outfielder (Mount Holly)
Chris Hanburger (born 1941), NFL linebacker for the Washington Redskins, member of the Pro Football Hall of Fame (Fort Bragg)
Josh Hamilton (born 1981), outfielder for Texas Rangers (Raleigh)
Dee Hardison (1956–2018), former NFL defensive lineman, primarily for Buffalo Bills and New York Giants (Jacksonville)
Jeff Hardy (born 1977), professional wrestler, entertainer (Cameron)
Justin Hardy (born 1991), wide receiver for Atlanta Falcons (Vanceboro)
Matt Hardy (born 1974), professional wrestler, entertainer (Cameron)
Montrezl Harrell (born 1994), power forward for Houston Rockets (Tarboro)
C. J. Harris, American basketball player in the Israeli Basketball Premier League (Winston-Salem)
Matt Harrison (born 1985), pitcher for Philadelphia Phillies (Durham)
Kendra Harrison (born 1992), Olympic hurdler and world record holder in the 100 m outdoor hurdles (Clayton)
Bryan Harvey (born 1963), MLB pitcher, two-time All-Star (1991, 1993) and AL saves leader in 1991 (Catawba)
Chris Hatcher (born 1985), pitcher for Los Angeles Dodgers (Kinston)
William Hayes (born 1985), defensive end for Tennessee Titans (High Point)
Brendan Haywood (born 1979), center for Cleveland Cavaliers (Greensboro)
Andy Headen (born 1960), linebacker for New York Giants 1983–1988 (Asheboro)
Madison Hedgecock (born 1981), fullback for St. Louis Rams and New York Giants; selected All-Pro in 2008 (Winston-Salem)
Gregory Helms (born 1974), professional wrestler, entertainer (Smithfield)
Tommy Helms, former Major League Baseball infielder, member of the Cincinnati Reds Hall of Fame (Charlotte)
Daniel Hemric (born 1991), NASCAR driver (Kannapolis)
B. J. Hill (born 1996), defensive end for the New York Giants (Oakboro)
Ryan Hill (born 1990), long-distance runner (Hickory)
Dave Henderson (born 1964), basketball player, 1991 Israeli Basketball Premier League MVP (Warrenton)
Sterling Hitchcock (born 1971), former MLB pitcher for New York Yankees and San Diego Padres (Fayetteville)
Megan Hodge (born 1988), indoor volleyball player (Durham)
Greg Holland (born 1985), relief pitcher for Colorado Rockies (Marion)
DeVonte Holloman (born 1991), former linebacker for Dallas Cowboys (Charlotte)
Torry Holt (born 1976), NC State and St. Louis Rams wide receiver (1999–2008); seven-time NFL Pro Bowl (Gibsonville)
Brad Hoover, football player for Carolina Panthers, attended Western Carolina University (Thoamsville)
Joe Horn (born 1972), wide receiver, Atlanta Falcons, New Orleans Saints (born in Connecticut; grew up in Fayetteville)
Josh Howard (born 1980), small forward and shooting guard for Utah Jazz (Winston-Salem)
Jason Hunter (born 1983), defensive end for Oakland Raiders (Charlotte)
Jim "Catfish" Hunter (1946–1999), Major League Baseball pitcher, starting for Oakland Athletics and New York Yankees in five World Series championships during 1970s; Baseball Hall of Fame (Hertford)
Othello Hunter (born 1986), basketball player in the Israeli Basketball Premier League (Winston-Salem)
D. J. Humphries (born 1993), NFL offensive tackle (Charlotte)
Brandon Ingram (born 1997), NBA for the Los Angeles Lakers (Kinston)
Mark Ingram Sr. (born 1965), NFL wide receiver, primarily with New York Giants (Gaston)
John Isner (born 1985), professional tennis player (Greensboro)
Bobby Jackson (born 1973), NBA player and assistant coach of Sacramento Kings (East Spencer)
Antawn Jamison (born 1976), NBA power forward and two-time All-Star (Charlotte)
Dale Jarrett (born 1956), long-time NASCAR driver and winner of 1999 NASCAR Championship (Conover)
Glenn Jarrett (born 1950), former NASCAR driver (Conover)
Ned Jarrett (born 1932), former NASCAR driver; two-time NASCAR champion (Conover)
Austin Johnson (born 1989), fullback for New Orleans Saints (Hickory)
Brad Johnson (born 1968), former NFL quarterback, won Super Bowl XXXVII with the Tampa Bay Buccaneers (Black Mountain)
Junior Johnson (1931–2019), moonshiner who eluded capture by outrunning law enforcement on mountain roads; early superstar of NASCAR; subject of 1965 Esquire magazine article by Tom Wolfe (Wilkes County)
Marc Johnson (born 1970), professional skateboarder (Winston-Salem)
Bobby Jones (born 1951), former NBA player, 4-time All-Star, 8-time All-Defensive First Team, member of the Naismith Memorial Basketball Hall of Fame (Charlotte)
Daniel Jones (born 1997), NFL quarterback for the New York Giants (Charlotte)
Sam Jones (1933–2021), Hall of Fame basketball player for Boston Celtics (Wilmington)
Michael Jordan (born 1963), basketball player, University of North Carolina, winner of six NBA championships with Chicago Bulls, 1984 and 1992 Olympics gold medalist, member of Pro Basketball Hall of Fame, NBA executive (Wilmington)
Sonny Jurgensen (born 1934), Pro Football Hall of Fame quarterback for Washington Redskins and Philadelphia Eagles; later served as commentator for Redskins radio (Wilmington)
Darius Kilgo (born 1991), nose tackle for Denver Broncos (Matthews)
Clyde King (1924–2010), MLB pitcher, coach, manager, general manager, and front office executive (Goldsboro)
 Stuart Krohn (born 1962), professional rugby union player (Durham)

L–N

Corey LaJoie (born 1991), NASCAR driver (Concord)
Mike LaValliere (born 1960), former MLB catcher who played with Philadelphia Phillies, St. Louis Cardinals and Pittsburgh Pirates (Charlotte)
Dexter Lawrence (born 1997), nose tackle for the New York Giants (Wake Forest)
Vonta Leach (born 1981), fullback for Baltimore Ravens (Lumberton)
Meadowlark Lemon (1932–2015), basketball player for Harlem Globetrotters; nicknamed the "Clown Prince" (Wilmington)
Buck Leonard (1907–1997), Baseball Hall of Fame, first baseman Homestead Grays (Rocky Mount)
Sugar Ray Leonard (born 1956), championship boxer, 1976 Olympic gold medalist, world welterweight champion (Wilmington)
Caroline Lind (born 1982), two-time Olympic gold medalist rower (Greensboro)
Camille Little (born 1985), WNBA player (Winston-Salem)
Greg Little (born 1989), wide receiver for Cleveland Browns (Durham)
Zack Littell (born 1995), relief pitcher for the Minnesota Twins (Mebane)
Sean Locklear (born 1981), offensive tackle for Seattle Seahawks (Lumberton)
Davis Love III (born 1964), professional golfer, attended UNC-Chapel Hill (Charlotte)
Calvin Lowry (born 1983), football player, Penn State and NFL's Tennessee Titans and Denver Broncos (Fayetteville)
John Lucas II (born 1953), former NBA player, assistant coach for Houston Rockets (Durham)
Bob Mann (1924–2006), wide receiver for Detroit Lions and Green Bay Packers; first African-American player for both teams; Green Bay Packers Hall of Fame in 1988 (New Bern)
Bruce Matthews (born 1961), former NFL offensive lineman, 7-time First-team All-Pro, 14-time Pro Bowl selection, member of Pro Football Hall of Fame (Raleigh)
Pete Maravich (1947–1988), Hall of Fame NBA player, graduated from Needham B. Broughton High School (Raleigh)
Ricardo Marsh (born 1981), basketball player, 2007 top scorer in the Israel Basketball Premier League (Hillsborough)
Kareem Martin (born 1992), outside linebacker for the New York Giants (Roanoke Rapids)
Mohamed Massaquoi (born 1986), wide receiver for Cleveland Browns (Charlotte)
J. B. Mauney (born 1987), professional bull rider on Built Ford Tough Series (Mooresville)
Cameron Maybin (born 1987), outfielder for New York Yankees (Asheville)
Eric Maynor (born 1987), point guard for Oklahoma City Thunder (Raeford)
Robert "Bob" McAdoo (born 1951), Hall of Fame basketball player for UNC-Chapel Hill and NBA champion Los Angeles Lakers; led UNC to 1971 NCAA Final Four (Greensboro)
Chris McCain (born 1991), linebacker for Miami Dolphins (Greensboro)
"Quickdraw" Rick McGraw (1955–1985), professional wrestler (Charlotte)
Bones McKinney (1919–1997), NBA player and college coach (Durham)
Kathy McMillan (born 1957), Olympic long jumper, member of National Track and Field Hall of Fame (Raeford)
Nate McMillan (born 1964), retired guard for Seattle SuperSonics; head coach for Portland Trail Blazers (Raleigh)
Whit Merrifield (born 1989), second baseman and left fielder for the Kansas City Royals (Advance)
David Merritt (born 1971), NFL linebacker, defensive backs coach for New York Giants (Raleigh)
Jason Miller (born 1980), mixed martial arts fighter (Fayetteville / Fort Bragg)
Kevin Millwood (born 1974), pitcher for Seattle Mariners (Gastonia)
Akil Mitchell (born 1992), American-Panamanian basketball player for Maccabi Rishon LeZion of the Israeli Premier League (Charlotte)
Bryan Mitchell (born 1991), pitcher for New York Yankees (Reidsville)
Brian Moehler (born 1971), starting pitcher for Houston Astros (Rockingham)
Scottie Montgomery (born 1978), NFL wide receiver, coach for Pittsburgh Steelers (Shelby)
Shannon Moore (born 1979), professional wrestler, entertainer (Cameron)
Sio Moore (born 1990), NFL linebacker (Apex)
Joe Morris (born 1960), running back for New York Giants and Cleveland Browns (Fort Bragg)
Anthony Morrow (born 1985), basketball player for Oklahoma City Thunder (Charlotte)
Wil Myers (born 1990), MLB outfielder for Tampa Bay Rays, San Diego Padres (Thomasville)
Fred "Curly" Neal (1942–2020), guard for Harlem Globetrotters (Greensboro)
John Hunter Nemechek (born 1997), NASCAR driver (Mooresville)
Hakeem Nicks (born 1988), NFL wide receiver, Super Bowl XLVI champion with New York Giants (Charlotte)

O–S

Matt Osborne (1957–2013), professional wrestler (Charlotte)
Willie Parker (born 1980), running back for Pittsburgh Steelers (Clinton)
Chris Paul (born 1985), All-Star point guard for Los Angeles Clippers, Houston Rockets, won NBA Rookie of the Year Award in 2006 (Lewisville)
Logan Pause (born 1981), Major League Soccer player and member of USMNT (Hillsborough)
Julius Peppers (born 1980), All-America football player and basketball player for UNC-Chapel Hill; only athlete in history to have played in both NCAA Final Four and NFL Super Bowl; All-Pro outside linebacker for Green Bay Packers (Bailey)
Gaylord Perry (born 1938), MLB pitcher in Baseball Hall of Fame; first to win Cy Young Award in both American and National Leagues (Williamston)
Greg Peterson (born 1984), defensive tackle, Tampa Bay Buccaneers, All-American at North Carolina Central University, Kenansville, North Carolina
Lee Petty (1914–2000), stock car driver, pioneer of NASCAR and three-time NASCAR champion in the 1950s; father of Richard Petty (Randleman)
Richard Petty (born 1937), stock car driver, holder of NASCAR record for all-time victories at 200, 7-time Cup Series champion; son of Lee Petty (Randleman)
Brandon Phillips (born 1981), second baseman for Atlanta Braves, two-time All-Star and won the Gold Glove Award three times (Raleigh)
Bradley Pinion (born 1994), punter for San Francisco 49ers (Concord)
Eddie Pope (born 1973), former Major League Soccer player, member of the USMNT, member of the National Soccer Hall of Fame (High Point)
J. T. Poston (born 1993), professional golfer (Hickory)
Landon Powell (born 1982), catcher and first baseman for Oakland A's (Raleigh)
Mike Quick, wide receiver with Philadelphia Eagles (1982–1990)
Shavlik Randolph (born 1983), NBA player (Raleigh)
Juvonte Reddic (born 1992), basketball player in the Israeli Basketball Premier League
Kevin Reddick (born 1989), linebacker for Carolina Panthers (New Bern)
Jeff Reed (born 1979), placekicker for Pittsburgh Steelers (Charlotte)
Mary Reynolds (1921–1991), player in All-American Girls Professional Baseball League (Gastonia)
Denzel Rice (born 1993), cornerback for Philadelphia Eagles (Winston-Salem)
Jerry Richardson (born 1936), NFL player for Baltimore Colts and owner of Carolina Panthers (Spring Hope)
Sylvester "Junkyard Dog" Ritter (1952–1998), professional wrestler and college football player (Wadesboro)
Brian Roberts (born 1977), MLB second baseman, primarily with Baltimore Orioles (Durham)
Lee Rouson (born 1962), running back for New York Giants and Cleveland Browns (Elizabeth City)
Kelvin Sampson (born 1955), head basketball coach for University of Houston (Laurinburg)
Charlie Sanders (1946–2015), Pro Football Hall of Fame tight end for Detroit Lions (Greensboro)
Corey Seager (born 1994), MLB shortstop, 2020 World Series MVP with the Los Angeles Dodgers (Charlotte)
Kyle Seager (born 1987), third baseman for Seattle Mariners (Kannapolis)
Richie Shaffer (born 1991), infielder for Tampa Bay Rays (Charlotte)
Tyler Shatley (born 1991), guard for Jacksonville Jaguars (Icard)
Kelvin Sampson (born 1955), head basketball coach for University of Houston (Laurinburg)
Mike Shildt (born 1968), manager for the St. Louis Cardinals (Charlotte)
Razor Shines (born 1956), first baseman for Montreal Expos (Durham)
Enos Slaughter (1916–2002), right fielder and Baseball Hall of Famer for St. Louis Cardinals and New York Yankees (Roxboro)
Terrmel Sledge (born 1977), former MLB outfielder and current outfielder for Yokohama BayStars (Fayetteville)
Ben Smith (born 1988), National Hockey League (NHL) player; first player born in NC to have name engraved in Stanley Cup (Winston-Salem)
D. J. Smith (born 1989), linebacker for Green Bay Packers (Charlotte)
Dennis Smith Jr. (born 1997), NBA player for New York Knicks (Fayetteville)
Ish Smith (born 1988), point guard for Oklahoma City Thunder, Detroit Pistons (Charlotte)
Brandon Spikes (born 1987), linebacker for New England Patriots (Shelby)
Jerry Stackhouse (born 1974), All-America basketball player for UNC-Chapel Hill and Atlanta Hawks, NBA's 1996 All-Rookie team (Kinston)
Dwight Stephenson (born 1957), former NFL center, member of the Pro Football Hall of Fame (Murfreesboro)
Melvin Stewart (born November 16, 1968), two-time Olympic gold medalist, International Swimming Hall of Fame, SwimSwam co-founder (Gastonia)"Where Are They Now?: Mel Stewart". Charlotte Magazine. July 20, 2010. Retrieved July 20, 2021.
Hal Stowe (born 1937), former pitcher for New York Yankees (Gastonia)
Braun Strowman (born 1985), professional wrestler, Entertainer (Sherrills Ford)
Ryan Succop (born 1986), NFL placekicker for Tampa Bay Buccaneers (Hickory)
Brett Swain (born 1986), wide receiver for San Francisco 49ers (Asheville)
J. R. Sweezy (born 1989), offensive guard for Seattle Seahawks (Mooresville)
John Swofford (born 1948), Commissioner of ACC, former Athletic Director of UNC-Chapel Hill (North Wilkesboro)

T–Z

Ray Tanner (born 1958), former college baseball head coach, Athletic Director at University of South Carolina (Benson)
Brandon Tate (born 1987), wide receiver for New England Patriots, holds NCAA career record for most combined return yards (3,523) (Burlington)
Ryan Taylor (born 1987), tight end for Green Bay Packers (Winston-Salem)
Cam Thomas (born 1986), nose tackle for San Diego Chargers (Eagle Springs)
David Thompson (born 1954), NC State basketball player, led team to 1974 NCAA championship over UCLA, four-time NBA All-Star, member of Basketball Hall of Fame (Shelby)
Wells Thompson (born 1983), former Major League Soccer player (Winston-Salem)
Leigh Torrence (born 1982), cornerback for New Orleans Saints (Raleigh)
P. J. Tucker (born 1985), player for Phoenix Suns and 2008 Israeli Basketball Premier League MVP (Raleigh)
Norv Turner (born 1952), NFL head coach for San Diego Chargers, Washington Redskins, Oakland Raiders (Camp Lejeune)
Brian Vickers (born 1983), NASCAR driver (Thomasville)
Fred Vinson (born 1971), NBA player, assistant coach for New Orleans Hornets (Murfreesboro)
Rube Walker (1926–1992), former MLB player and manager, two-time World Series Champion with the Brooklyn/Los Angeles Dodgers (Lenoir)
Adam Warren (born 1987), relief pitcher for New York Yankees (New Bern)
Greg Warren (born 1981), long snapper for Pittsburgh Steelers (Goldsboro)
T. J. Warren (born 1993), small forward for Phoenix Suns (Durham)
Stephanie Watts (born 1997), WNBA player (Wesley Chapel)
Carson Wentz (born 1992), NFL quarterback (Raleigh)
Alex White (born 1988), pitcher for Cleveland Indians and Colorado Rockies (Greenville)
Johnny White (born 1988), NFL running back for Buffalo Bills and Green Bay Packers (Asheville)
Tyler White (born 1990), first baseman for the Los Angeles Dodgers (Mooresboro)
Josh Whitesell (born 1983), former MLB first baseman (Durham)
Hassan Whiteside (born 1989), power forward and center for Sacramento Kings (Gastonia)
Chris Wilcox (born 1982), power forward/center for Boston Celtics (Raleigh)
Hoyt Wilhelm (1923–2002), Baseball Hall of Fame pitcher, Baltimore Orioles Chicago White Sox (Huntersville)
Damien Wilkins (born 1980), small forward and shooting guard for Detroit Pistons (Washington)
Brian Williams (born 1979), former NFL cornerback (High Point)
Buck Williams (born 1960), NBA player for New Jersey Nets, Portland Trail Blazers, and New York Knicks, assistant coach for Trail Blazers; won 1982 NBA Rookie of the Year Award (Rocky Mount)
C. J. Williams (born 1990), basketball player in the Israeli Basketball Premier League
Mario Williams (born 1985), NC State football player, first ACC player selected No. 1 overall in NFL draft; defensive end for Buffalo Bills (Richlands)
Maxie Williams (1940–2009), NFL offensive lineman (Granite Falls)
Perry Williams (born 1961), former cornerback for New York Giants (Hamlet)
Roy Williams (born 1950), UNC-Chapel Hill men's basketball coach since 2003; led UNC-Chapel Hill to 2005, 2009, and 2017 NCAA basketball national championships (Spruce Pine)
Zion Williamson (born 2000), NBA player for New Orleans Pelicans (Salisbury)
Adrian Wilson (born 1979), All-Pro NFL safety, member of Arizona Cardinals Ring of Honor (High Point)
C. J. Wilson (born 1987), defensive end for Green Bay Packers (Belhaven)
Alex Wood (born 1991), pitcher for Los Angeles Dodgers (Charlotte)
James Worthy (born 1961), basketball player for UNC-Chapel Hill, Most Valuable Player of 1982 NCAA basketball championship game, winner of three NBA titles with Los Angeles Lakers, broadcaster (Gastonia)
Anthony Wright (born 1976), former NFL quarterback (Vanceboro)
Debbie Yow (born 1950), former Athletic Director of Saint Louis, Maryland, and NC State (Gibsonville)
Kay Yow (1942–2009), women's college basketball coach, member of the Women's Basketball Hall of Fame and Naismith Memorial Basketball Hall of Fame (Gibsonville)
Ryan Zimmerman (born 1984), All-Star third baseman for Washington Nationals (Washington)

Writers

Jason V. Brock (born 1970), author, artist, editor, filmmaker (Charlotte)
Don Brown (born 1960), author, attorney, former naval officer (Plymouth)
Betsy Byars (1928–2020), children's author (Charlotte)
Wiley Cash, novelist (Gastonia)
Fred Chappell (born 1936), author and North Carolina Poet Laureate 1997–2002 (Canton)
Jennie Thornley Clarke (1860-1924), educator, writer, and anthologist
Ellis Credle (1902–1998), author of books for children and young adults, including Down Down the Mountain (1934) (Hyde County)
Sarah Dessen (born 1970), writer of novels for young adults (Chapel Hill)
Thomas Dixon Jr. (1864–1946), author of The Clansman (Shelby)
Fanny Murdaugh Downing (1831-1894), first resident novelist of Mecklenburg County
Pamela Duncan (born 1961), novelist whose books often focus on working-class Southerners (Asheville)
John Ehle (1925–2018), author (Asheville)
Charles Frazier (born 1950), author of best-selling novel Cold Mountain (Asheville)
Kaye Gibbons (born 1960), author of novels Ellen Foster and A Virtuous Woman (Rocky Mount)
Jim Grimsley (born 1955), novelist and playwright (Pollocksville)
Mary Coffin Johnson (1834–1928), activist, writer (North Carolina)
Jan Karon (born 1937), novelist (Hudson)
Margaret Maron, award-winning author of mystery novels (Greensboro)
Armistead Maupin (born 1944), writer known for his Tales of the City series of novels based in San Francisco (Raleigh)
Sharyn McCrumb (born 1948), writer whose books celebrate the history and folklore of Appalachia (Wilmington)
William Sydney Porter (1862–1910), prolific short story writer under pen name O. Henry whose works include The Ransom of Red Chief and The Gift of the Magi (Greensboro)
Tom Robbins (born 1932), author of best-selling novels including Even Cowgirls Get The Blues (Blowing Rock)
Emily McGary Selinger (1848–1927), writer, poet (Wilmington)
Theodore Taylor (1921–2006), author of more than 50 books for young adults including The Cay (Statesville)
Timothy Tyson, historian at Duke University and author of the best-selling book Blood Done Sign My Name (Oxford)
Sarah J. C. Whittlesey (1824–1896), author, poet, hymnwriter (Williamston)
Thomas Wolfe (1900–1938), author of classic novels such as Look Homeward, Angel and You Can't Go Home Again (Asheville)

Aviation and aerospace

Sam Beddingfield (1933–2012), test pilot and NASA employee (Clayton)
Curtis Brown (born 1956), former NASA astronaut and United States Air Force (USAF) colonel (Elizabethtown)
Myrtle Cagle (1925–2019), pilot and flight test instructor, one of the Mercury 13 female astronauts group
Charles Duke (born 1935), Apollo 16 astronaut; tenth and youngest person to walk on moon (Charlotte)
Willie H. Fuller (1919–1995), combat fighter pilot and combat flight instructor with the 332d Expeditionary Operations Group 99th Pursuit Squadron, best known as the Tuskegee Airmen or "Red Tails" (Tarboro)
Viola Gentry (1894–1988), aviator, set the first non-refueling endurance record for women (Rockingham)
Caleb V. Haynes (1895–1966), USAF major general, air pioneer (Surry County)
Susan Helms (born 1958), USAF lieutenant general and NASA astronaut (Charlotte)
William S. McArthur (born 1951), United States Army colonel, test pilot, and NASA astronaut (Laurinburg)
George Preddy (1919–1944), USAF fighter ace (Greensboro)
Edward F. Rector (1916–2001), USAF fighter ace, member of the Flying Tigers (Marshall)
Ida Van Smith (1917–2003), pilot and flight instructor (Lumberton)
William E. Thornton (1929–2021), NASA astronaut (Faison)
Earl P. Yates (1923–2021), rear admiral in the United States Navy and United States Naval Aviator (Winston-Salem)

Religious leaders

Ernest Angley (1921–2021), Christian evangelist and pastor of Grace Cathedral (Gastonia)
Leonard Bolick, pastor of the Evangelical Lutheran Church in America and served as the bishop of the North Carolina Evangelical Lutheran Synod from 1997 to 2015 (Lenoir)
Casey Cole, American Franciscan friar, Catholic priest, writer, and blogger (Cary)
Billy Graham (1918–2018), Christian evangelist and unofficial religious advisor to U.S. Presidents from Dwight D. Eisenhower to Bill Clinton (Charlotte)
Franklin Graham (born 1952), Christian evangelist and missionary (Asheville)
Anne Graham Lotz (born 1948), Christian evangelist and daughter of Billy Graham (Montreat)
James A. Forbes (born 1935), minister (Raleigh)
Paul Henkel (1754–1825), itinerant evangelist for the Lutheran Church (Rowan County)
John P. Kee (born 1962), gospel singer and pastor (Durham)
Owen L. W. Smith (1851–1926), minister and diplomat of the United States (Sampson County)
Ben Witherington III (born 1951), New Testament scholar (High Point)

Miscellaneous

Louis H. Asbury (1877–1975), architect, many works listed on U.S. National Register of Historic Places (Charlotte)
John David Roy Atchison (1954–2007), Assistant US Attorney and children's sports coach, committed suicide in prison after being charged with soliciting sex from a 5-year-old girl (Chapel Hill)
Penelope Barker (1728–1796), activist in the American Revolution, helped organize the boycott of British goods in 1774 known as the Edenton Tea Party (Edenton)
Daniel Boone (1734–1820), explorer, lived in the Yadkin River valley of western North Carolina for many years (Mocksville)
Fred Brooks (born 1931), software engineer and computer scientist (Durham)
Eliza Bryant (1827–1907), humanitarian (Wayne County)
Judy Clarke (born 1952), criminal defense attorney in many high-profile cases (Asheville)
John Cocke (1925–2002), computer scientist (Charlotte)
Chelsea Cooley (born 1983), Miss USA 2005 (Mint Hill)
Virginia Dare (1587–unknown), first person of English heritage born in the New World, to the Roanoke Colony, "The Lost Colony" (Roanoke Island)
Jennifer Pharr Davis (born 1983), set record for quickest Appalachian Trail hike in 2011 (Hendersonville)
Nia Franklin (born 1993), Miss America 2019 (Winston-Salem)
Connie Guion (1882–1971), female physician, influential in developing health care systems (Lincolnton)
Martha Hunt (born 1989), Model (Wilson)
Adam Leroy Lane (born 1964), convicted murderer and serial killer (Jonesville)
Jordan Lloyd (born 1986), reality television participant, winner of the Big Brother 11 (Matthews)
Leonard McBury, explorer of Tennessee
Dan McGalliard (1940–2021), inventor and innovator (Burke County)
Gideon Morris (1756–1798), trans-Appalachian pioneer and founder of Morristown, Tennessee (Randolph County)
Benjamin Chavis Muhammad (born 1948), civil rights leader (Oxford)
Erica Payne, public policy expert, commentator, author and strategist (Raleigh)
Conrad Reed (1787–1845), found a large gold nugget while fishing, triggering the first gold rush in the United States (Midland)
Rachel Reilly (born 1984), reality television participant, winner of Big Brother 13 (Concord)
Afeni Shakur (1947–2016), former Black Panther, philanthropist, and mother of Tupac Shakur (Lumberton)
David A. Smith (born 1957), computer scientist, specializing in interactive 3D (Camp Lejeune)

North Carolina residents later in life, raised elsewhere
A–L

Harry Anderson (1952–2018), actor best known as Judge Harry Stone from the television series Night Court, 1984–1992 (Asheville)
Maya Angelou (1928–2014), poet, historian, author, actress, playwright, producer, director, and professor at Wake Forest University (Winston-Salem)
Joseph Bathanti (born 1953), poet, writer, professor; North Carolina Poet Laureate (Vilas)
 Frances Bavier (1902–1989), actress, the Andy Griffith Show (Siler City)
Marshall Brain (born 1961), technology expert and internet personality at HowStuffWorks.com (Raleigh)
Chang and Eng Bunker (1811–1874), the original Siamese twins who performed for audiences in Asia, Europe, and North America before settling in the mountains of North Carolina and marrying two local sisters (Wilkesboro)
Orson Scott Card (born 1951), lecturer and author of the award-winning science fiction book Ender's Game (Greensboro)
John Carroll (1942–2015), journalist and newspaper editor for the Los Angeles Times and The Baltimore Sun (Winston-Salem)
Eva Clayton (born 1934), U.S. Congresswoman from North Carolina 1992–2003; she graduated from Johnson C. Smith University and North Carolina Central University
Allison Hedge Coke (born 1958), American Book Award-winning author of Blood Run and other novels (raised in North Carolina, various counties)
John Edwards (born 1953), former U.S. Senator and 2004 Democratic Vice-Presidential nominee (Robbins)
Renee Ellmers (born 1964), U.S. Congresswoman from North Carolina 2011–2017 (Dunn)
Ric Flair (born 1949), most decorated professional wrestling champion of all time (Charlotte)
Robert Wilkie (born 1962), Defense Department Leader and National Security Assistant to the President (Fayetteville)
John Hope Franklin (1915–2009), historian and professor of African-American history at Duke University; also a civil-rights activist in the 1950s and 1960s (Durham)
Harry Golden (1902–1981), Jewish-American humorist, writer and publisher of the Carolina Israelite; author, Only in America (Charlotte)
T. Adelaide Goodno (1858-1931), president, North Carolina Woman's Christian Temperance Union
Alex Grant, Scottish-born American poet, instructor (Chapel Hill)
Bob Havens (born 1930), musician who played trombone for the Lawrence Welk orchestra, 1960–1983, born in Quincy, Illinois (Buies Creek)
Joseph Hewes (1730–1779), signatory of the Declaration of Independence for North Carolina and first U.S. Secretary of the Navy (Edenton)
Samantha Holvey (born 1986), Miss North Carolina USA 2006 (Buies Creek)
Si Kahn (born 1944), singer-songwriter and activist, supporting numerous civil-rights and environmental causes with his music (Charlotte)
Mike Krzyzewski (born 1947), long-time men's basketball coach for Duke University, garnering four NCAA basketball national championships (Durham)
Harvey Littleton (1922–2013), glass artist, founder of American Studio Glass movement (Spruce Pine)

M–Z

Wilmer Mizell (1930–1990), Major League Baseball pitcher and NC congressman (Midway)
Sue Myrick (born 1941), Mayor of Charlotte 1987–1991; U.S. Congresswoman from North Carolina 1995–2013 (Charlotte)
Michael Peterson (born 1943), novelist and convicted murderer; currently serving a life sentence for the 2003 murder of his wife (Durham)
Tom Regan (1938–2017), philosopher and animal rights activist at North Carolina State University
Kathy Reichs (born 1950), forensic anthropologist at the University of North Carolina, Chapel Hill; also the author of best-selling mystery novels featuring the character Temperance Brennan (Charlotte)
Tony Rice (1951–2020), musician (Reidsville)
Eric Rudolph (born 1966), anti-abortion terrorist currently serving five life sentences for the bombing at the 1996 Summer Olympics which killed one person and injured 111 others; Rudolph eluded capture for 5 years (Murphy)
Randolph Scott (1898–1987), film actor 1928–1962; his most enduring image is that of the tall-in-the-saddle Western hero; of his more than 100 film appearances, more than 60 were in Westerns (Charlotte)
Dean Smith (1931–2015), retired men's basketball coach for the University of North Carolina, Chapel Hill; member of the National Collegiate Basketball Hall of Fame; earned 879 wins and two national championships in his career (Chapel Hill)
Lee Smith (born 1944), author and instructor at North Carolina State University, winner of the O. Henry award for short-story writing (Hillsborough)
Nicholas Sparks (born 1965), author of romance novels; born in Omaha, Nebraska and grew up in California (New Bern)
Edward Teach (1680–1718), pirate known as Blackbeard, who kept his hide-out in the harbor of Ocracoke Island on North Carolina's Outer Banks (Ocracoke)
John Tesh (born 1952), musician and television personality, best known as the host of the television series Entertainment Tonight 1986–1996 (Winston-Salem)
George Washington Vanderbilt II (1862–1914), billionaire who created the Biltmore Estate in the North Carolina mountains; it is the largest privately owned mansion in the Western Hemisphere and North Carolina's top tourist attraction (Asheville)
Blake R. Van Leer (1893–1956), president of Georgia Tech, inventor and civil rights advocate (Raleigh)
Daniel Wallace (born 1959), author of the best-selling novel Big Fish: A Novel of Mythic Proportions (Chapel Hill)
Hugh Williamson (1735–1819), physician; third NC signatory of the Constitution (Edenton)
Kristi Yamaguchi (born 1971), figure skater and member of the U.S. Olympic Hall of Fame, former North Carolina resident (Raleigh)
Brittany York (born 1989), Miss North Carolina USA 2011 (Wilmington)

Spent time or studied in North Carolina
 
Mark Alarie (born 1963), former college basketball player for Duke University, played for the NBA's Denver Nuggets and Washington Bullets (Durham)
Grayson Allen (born 1995), former college basketball player for Duke University, current NBA player (Durham)
Sandra Bullock (born 1964), movie actress; attended East Carolina University (Greenville)
Nick Cannon (born 1980), actor, comedian, television personality; graduated from Quail Hollow Middle School (Charlotte)
Perry Como (1912–2001), popular crooner and host of "The Perry Como Show", part-time resident of the NC mountains (near Asheville)
Dan Cortese, MTV host, graduate of UNC-Chapel Hill (Chapel Hill)
Joey Dorsey (born 1983), NBA basketball player for the Sacramento Kings and alumnus of Laurinburg Institute (Laurinburg)
Lawrence Ferlinghetti (1919–2021), poet and owner-operator of the City Lights Bookstore famous for promoting the works of beatnik writers and poets; attended UNC Chapel Hill (Chapel Hill)
Mia Hamm (born 1972), former soccer player for UNC-Chapel Hill, two-time Olympic gold medalist, twice named FIFA's World Player of the Year (Chapel Hill)
Grant Hill (born 1972), former NBA player, graduated from Duke University (Durham)
Kyrie Irving (born 1992), attended Duke University, NBA player (Durham)
Jesse Jackson (born 1941), politician, preacher, civil rights activist, graduated from North Carolina A&T State University (Greensboro)
Marion Jones (born 1975), former basketball player for UNC-Chapel Hill and Olympic runner, winner of three gold medals at the 2000 Summer Olympics (Chapel Hill)
Christian Laettner (born 1969), played college basketball for Duke University, former NBA Player (Durham)
David Lynch (born 1946), film director and artist best known for directing the film Blue Velvet and the television series Twin Peaks, spent part of his childhood in NC (Durham)
Khalid Sheikh Mohammed (born 1964 or 1965), terrorist known for masterminding the 9/11 attacks, attended Chowan College and obtained a degree from North Carolina Agricultural and Technical State University (Greensboro)
Richard Nixon (1913–1994), 37th President of the United States, graduated from the Duke University School of Law in 1937 (Durham)
Arnold Palmer (1929–2016), professional golfer and four-time winner of The Masters Tournament, attended Wake Forest University (Winston-Salem)
Mary-Louise Parker (born 1964), film and television actress; graduated from the North Carolina School of the Arts; star of the film Fried Green Tomatoes and the television series The West Wing and Weeds; winner of Emmy, Tony, and Golden Globe awards (Winston-Salem)
Missi Pyle (born 1972), film actress, graduated from the North Carolina School of the Arts, star of films such as Bringing Down the House, Charlie and the Chocolate Factory and Galaxy Quest (Winston-Salem)
Philip Rivers (born 1981), star quarterback for North Carolina State University, set school records in passing yardage and touchdowns, currently the starting quarterback for the National Football League's San Diego Chargers team (Raleigh)
Jada Pinkett Smith (born 1971), actress and singer, attended North Carolina School of the Arts, starred in the popular television series A Different World and in the movies The Nutty Professor and The Matrix Reloaded and The Matrix Revolutions'' (Winston-Salem)
Lawrence Taylor (born 1959), former football player for the New York Giants and member of the Pro Football Hall of Fame, All-America football player for UNC-Chapel Hill (Chapel Hill)

See also

By location

 List of people from Asheville, North Carolina
 List of people from Charlotte, North Carolina
 List of people from Fayetteville, North Carolina
 List of people from Greensboro, North Carolina 
 List of people from Raleigh, North Carolina
 List of people from Winston-Salem, North Carolina

By educational affiliation

 List of Davidson College people
 List of Duke University people
 List of East Carolina University alumni
 List of East Carolina University faculty
 List of North Carolina State University people
 List of University of North Carolina Wilmington alumni
 List of University of North Carolina at Chapel Hill alumni
 List of University of North Carolina at Chapel Hill leaders
 List of alumni of the University of North Carolina School of the Arts
 List of Wake Forest University people

Other
 Lists of Americans

References